Erica Prugger (born 22 June 1945) is an Italian luger. She competed at the 1964 Winter Olympics and the 1968 Winter Olympics.

References

External links
 

1945 births
Living people
Italian female lugers
Olympic lugers of Italy
Lugers at the 1964 Winter Olympics
Lugers at the 1968 Winter Olympics
People from Urtijëi
Sportspeople from Südtirol